Welcome is the third solo studio album by the blues rock guitarist Doyle Bramhall II, the first to feature his band Smokestack. It was first released in the US in 2001, then re-released in 2008. When it was re-released it was credited solely to Bramhall. The album is produced by Benmont Tench of Tom Petty and the Heartbreakers under the RCA Records label. An expanded 2CD edition was released on December 15, 2017.

Track listing
 "Green Light Girl"  
 "Problem Child"      
 "So You Want It to Rain"           
 "Life"        
 "Helpless Man"            
 "Soul Shaker"     
 "Send Some Love"     
 "Smokestack"         
 "Last Night"         
 "Blame"         
 "Thin Dream"     
 "Cry"

Personnel
Doyle Bramhall II - Guitar, Vocals
Smokestack - Primary artist, Band
Craig Ross - Guitars
Susannah Melvoin - Percussion, Vocals
Brian Gardner - Mastering
Mike Scotella - Assistant Engineer
Chris Bruce - Composer
Jim Scott - Engineer, Mixing, Producer
Shari Sutcliffe - Production Coordination
Benmont Tench - Organ, Piano

References

2001 albums
Doyle Bramhall II albums
RCA Records albums